Alexander Muir was a Scottish professional football full back who made over 150 appearances in the Scottish League for Albion Rovers.

References 

Brentford F.C. wartime guest players
Scottish footballers
Scottish Football League players
Association football fullbacks
Year of birth missing
Year of death missing
Place of birth missing
Burnbank Athletic F.C. players
Albion Rovers F.C. players
Fulham F.C. wartime guest players
Crystal Palace F.C. wartime guest players
Tottenham Hotspur F.C. wartime guest players
Clapton Orient F.C. wartime guest players